Življenje in tehnika (Life & Technology) is a Slovene-language monthly magazine about popular science. It has been published since 1950, at first under the name Ljudska tehnika (The Technology of the People). In 1952, it was renamed to its current title. It is still one of the magazines with the greatest readership in Slovenia. The magazine focuses mainly on engineering, medicine, biology, archeology and computer science. It is published by Tehniška založba Slovenije (Slovenian Technical Publishing).

See also
 List of magazines in Slovenia

External links
Življenje in tehnika
Tehniška založba Slovenije

1950 establishments in Slovenia
Magazines established in 1950
Mass media in Ljubljana
Monthly magazines
Science and technology magazines
Slovene-language magazines
Magazines published in Slovenia
Popular science magazines